Big Sugar may refer to

 Big Sugar, a nickname for the sugar industry
 Big Sugar (band), Canadian rock band
 Big Sugar (album), their debut album
 Big Sugar (nickname), baseball player
 Big Sugar, a video game publisher

See also 
 Big Sugar Creek